Michael Rogers Oldfield Thomas  (21 February 1858 – 16 June 1929) was a British zoologist.

Career 
Thomas worked at the Natural History Museum on mammals, describing about 2,000 new species and subspecies for the first time. He was appointed to the museum secretary's office in 1876, transferring to the zoological department in 1878.

In 1891, Thomas married Mary Kane, daughter of Sir Andrew Clark, heiress to a small fortune, which gave him the finances to hire mammal collectors and present their specimens to the museum. He also did field work himself in Western Europe and South America. His wife shared his interest in natural history, and accompanied him on collecting trips. In 1896, when William Henry Flower took control of the department, he hired Richard Lydekker to rearrange the exhibitions, allowing Thomas to concentrate on these new specimens.

Thomas viewed his taxonomy efforts from the scope of British imperialism. "You and I in our scientific lives have seen the general knowledge of Mammals of the world wonderfully advanced – there are few or no blank areas anymore," he said in a letter to Gerrit Smith Miller Jr.

Officially retired from the museum in 1923, he continued his work without interruption. Although popular rumours suggested he died by shooting himself with a handgun while sitting at his museum desk, he actually died at home in 1929, aged 71, about a year after the death of his wife, "a severe blow from which he never recovered".

Taxonomic descriptions

Higher ranks

Genera

Species

See also
 :Category:Taxa named by Oldfield Thomas

References

External links

Further reading
 The collected works of Oldfield Thomas

1858 births
19th-century British zoologists
20th-century British zoologists
British mammalogists
British taxonomists
English taxonomists
Employees of the Natural History Museum, London
Fellows of the Royal Society
Fellows of the Zoological Society of London
People from Bedfordshire (before 1965)
1929 deaths